Zlatá labuť (The Golden Swan in English) is a Czech television series written and produced by Filip Bobiňský, Jan Coufal and Petr Šizling. It was created by Dramedy Productions for TV Nova. First episode premiered on Voyo on 26 January 2023. It is set in the department store of the era of the Protectorate of Bohemia and Moravia. Starring Marta Danzingerová, Beáta Kaňoková, Simona Lewandovská, Kristýna Ryška, Adam Vacula, Robert Mikluš, Petr Kostka, Daniela Kolářová, Tomáš Töpfer, Michaela Maurerová and others.

Synopsis
Bára Veselá is constantly pursued by bad luck and is on the run from the law. By chance, she unwillingly becomes a salesperson for the fashion department at the newly-opened department store, Zlatá labuť. This store is a magnificent palace of luxury and is a new modern landmark in the center of Prague. The store holds a rich history behind its opulent storefronts. It is March 15, 1939, and German occupation forces are invading the Czechoslovakian state.

Cast and characters 
 Marta Dancingerová as Bára Veselá
 Beáta Kaňoková as Eva Dušková
 Simona Lewandowská as Alena Zimová
 Petr Kostka as Rudolf Kučera
 Daniela Kolářová as Božena Kučerová
 Petr Stach as Rudolf Kučera jr.
 Adam Vacula as Petr Kučera
 Kristýna Ryška as Irena Mašková
 Robert Mikluš as Lukáš Mašek
 Tomáš Töpfer as Arne Pulkráb
 Robin Ferro as Kamil Pulkráb
 Lucie Štěpánková as Anna Maurerová
 Adrian Jastraban as Vilém Maurer
 Hana Kusnjerová as Valerie Horká
 Ema Businská as Kristýna Malá
 Vojtěch Vodochodský as Vojta
 Ladislav Hampl as Antonín Bouchner
 Gabriela Míčová as Magdalena Praxlová
 Vasil Fridrich as Karel Wágner
 Marek Kristián Hochman as waiter
 Kamila Trnková as pianist
 Jacob Erftemeijer as Oldřich Skalský
 Pavel Řezníček as Václav Mach

Slovak adaptation
Markíza produced a series called Dunaj, k vašim službám (Dunaj, at your service) which is a Slovak version of Zlatá labuť.

Episodes

References

External links 
 Official page
 Zlatá labuť on Voyo.cz
 

TV Nova (Czech TV channel) original programming
Czech drama television series
2023 Czech television series debuts
World War II television series
Czech historical television series